Lars Emil Almén (born June 30, 1980, in Sala, Sweden) is a Swedish actor. He studied at Skara Skolscen and at the Swedish National Academy of Mime and Acting. Now he works at Stockholm City Theatre.

Filmography

References

External links

Swedish Film Database

Swedish male actors
Living people
1980 births